is a private junior and senior high school for boarding and day students in grades 7–12.
 It is a co-educational college preparatory school, with approximately 1,600 students.



Overview
As of 2014, the principal of the Academy and the Junior High School is Yoshihisa Kamimura, while the principal of the High School is Shiro Fukui.

Nishiyamato Academy of California, a Japanese elementary and junior high school for day and Saturday students in Lomita, California in the Los Angeles metropolitan area,
 was founded by Ryotaro Tanose, a Japanese Diet member, as a branch of the Nishiyamato Gakuen.

 (大和大学 Yamato daigaku) is affiliated with the school.

Facilities

Dormitory
The school has one dormitory, .
 It has eight rooms for junior high school students, with eight students per room. It has 19 rooms for high school students, with each room having four students. As of 2012, there were 118 students in the dormitory. Of them, 30% came from the Chubu region, 29% came from the Kansai region, 17% came from the Chugoku region and Shikoku, 11% came from Kanto region, 5% came from Kyushu and Okinawa Prefecture, and 2% came from Hokkaido and the Tohoku region. The remaining 6% are returnees from overseas places. Seiun-ryo opened in 1992.

References

External links
 Nishiyamato Gakuen Junior High School and High School

Schools in Nara Prefecture
High schools in Nara Prefecture